Skims is an American shapewear and clothing brand co-founded by Kim Kardashian, Emma Grede, and Jens Grede. Skims has a focus on body positivity and inclusivity across the brand and practice inclusive sizing. The company was valued at over $3.2 billion in January 2022.

History 

The company was founded in June 2019 by American media personality, businesswoman Kim Kardashian and Swedish entrepreneur Jens Grede. Kardashian's then husband, Kanye West, was credited as being her "Ghost Creative Director" and for creating the company's unique logo. Prior to creation of this line, Kardashian was inspired by her own creative work of altering clothes, stating she "[has been] designing shapewear for 15 years".

Skims's initial launch resulted in more than US$2 million in profit and the company selling out of merchandise in 10 minutes. The company claims to have sold more than 3 million products in its first year in business.

In April 2021, the company was reported to be worth over US$1.6 billion. After further investments, the valuation of Skims was reported at US$3.2 billion in January 2022.

In March 2022, Skims made it to TIME's List of 100 Most Influential Companies of the year 2022.

Products 
Skims is notable for its wide range of sizes that range from XXS to 5XL. Skims shape wear also comes in nine different shades to accommodate different skin tones. In addition to shape wear, Skims has released many different collections in lounge wear, lingerie and accessories including bras, underwear, bodysuits, dresses, shorts, sweatpants, tops, hoodies, sweaters and slides.

Initially sold direct to consumer via SKIMS.com, Skims products are now being sold on a variety of websites and in Nordstrom stores.

Collaborations 
Skims has collaborated with many companies. In 2021, the company established a partnership with the United States Olympics team providing Team USA and Skims branded athleisure for its athletes. The athletes wore the clothing during the 2020 Summer Olympics and Paralympics in Tokyo, and at the 2022 Winter Olympics in Beijing.

In October 2021, the company collaborated with Italian fashion house Fendi, creating a capsule collection of FENDI x SKIMS branded shapewear, leather dresses, and swimsuits. The collaboration was inspired by a Fendi collection previously released in 1978 by Karl Lagerfeld. Bloomberg News reported that the collaboration generated an estimated US$3 million in sales within 10 minutes of its release.

Controversies 
The company was originally named Kimono by Kardashian and Jens Grede. The company's initial name was criticized by critics which argued that it disrespected Japanese culture and ignored the significance behind the country's traditional outfit. Before its launch, the hashtag "#KimOhNo" began trending on Twitter, and the mayor of Kyoto, Daisaku Kadokawa, wrote to Kardashian asking her to reconsider the company name and trademark for Kimono. In response to public pressure, Kardashian announced that she would change the company's name to Skims.

Skims has been accused of photoshopping numerous advertising campaigns. In February 2021, Kendall Jenner, Kardashian's half-sister, was accused of photoshopping ad campaign images and video to her own social media. In June 2021, Skims was accused of manipulating ad campaign footage featuring Kardashian.

In April 2022, Skims released a campaign with celebrated models Tyra Banks, Heidi Klum, Alessandra Ambrosio and Candice Swanepoel. A conversation emerged about Banks being photoshopped, which compared side-by-side campaign images to video taken at the shoot.

Marketing  
The company frequently utilizes influencer marketing by having celebrities and social media influencers wear their clothes. Kylie Jenner, Kendall Jenner, Kourtney Kardashian and Khloé Kardashian have been seen wearing Skims numerous times on social media and in Skims advertising campaigns. Other celebrities that have participated in Skims campaigns include Kate Moss, Candice Swanepoel, Heidi Klum, Tyra Banks, Paris Hilton and Paris Jackson.

Financials 
Skims's initial launch resulted in more than US$2 million in profit and the company selling out of merchandise in 10 minutes. The company claims to have sold more than 3 million products in its first year in business.

In April 2021, the company was reported to be worth over US$1.6 billion. After further investments, the valuation of Skims was reported at US$3.2 billion in January 2022.

Awards 
In 2021, founder Kim Kardashian was given a "Brand Innovator" award for her work on Skims by Wall Street Journal Magazine's Innovator Awards.

References

External links
 

Kim Kardashian
Fashion accessory brands
American companies established in 2019
Clothing brands of the United States